The 2019 Spanish Indoor Athletics Championships was the 55th edition of the annual indoor track and field competition organised by the Royal Spanish Athletics Federation (RFEA), which serves as the Spanish national indoor championship for the sport. A total of 26 events (divided evenly between the sexes) were contested over two days on 16 and 17 February at the Centro de Atletismo VI Centenario in Antequera, Málaga.

María Vicente set a Spanish indoor record of 4412 points for the women's pentathlon while Jesús Gómez won the men's 1500 metres in a championship record time of 3:41.37 minutes.

Results

Men

Women

References

Results
LV Campeonato  de España Absoluto de Atletismo. RFEA. Retrieved 2019-09-07.

External links
Official website for the Royal Spanish Athletics Federation

Spanish Indoor Athletics Championships
Spanish Indoor Athletics Championships
Spanish Indoor Athletics Championships
Spanish Indoor Athletics Championships
Sport in Málaga